The J.W. Burnham House is a historic house near Haynesville, Louisiana. It has been listed on the National Register of Historic Places since January 22, 1987.

The house was built in 1890 and was modified in about 1900 to add elements of Queen Anne architecture.  The modifications included enlarging the attic, adding two octagonal corner towers, and adding a wraparound porch.

The house was further modified in 1935, in the 1940s and in 1985.  It was once the center of a complex including a "Burnham, Louisiana" post office, a saw mill, and more.

See also
National Register of Historic Places listings in Claiborne Parish, Louisiana

References

Houses on the National Register of Historic Places in Louisiana
Houses completed in 1900
Buildings and structures in Claiborne Parish, Louisiana